Damini Ebunoluwa Ogulu  (born 2 July 1991), known professionally as Burna Boy, is a Nigerian singer, songwriter and record producer. He rose to stardom in 2012 after releasing "Like to Party", the lead single from his debut studio album L.I.F.E (2013). In 2017, Burna Boy signed with Bad Habit/Atlantic Records in the United States and Warner Music Group internationally. His third studio album Outside (2018) marked his major-label debut.   

In 2019, he won Best International Act at the 2019 BET Awards, and was announced as Apple Music Up Next artist that year. His fourth studio album, titled African Giant, was released in July 2019. It won Album of the Year at the 2019 All Africa Music Awards and was nominated for Best World Music Album at the 62nd Annual Grammy Awards. He was awarded African Artist of the Year at the 2020 Ghana Music Awards.
Burna Boy released his fifth studio album, Twice as Tall, in August 2020. It won Best World Music Album at the 63rd Annual Grammy Awards. He won Best International Act at the 2021 BET Awards.  

Burna Boy's sixth studio album, Love, Damini, was released in July 2022 and became the highest debut of an African album on the Billboard 200 chart. It also became the highest charted African album in the Netherlands, United Kingdom and France. In October, Burna Boy was awarded the Member of the Order of the Federal Republic plaque for his achievements in music. In 2023, Rolling Stone ranked him number 197 on its list of the 200 greatest singers of all time.

Life and music career

Early life and education
Damini Ebunoluwa Ogulu was born on 2 July 1991, in Port Harcourt, Rivers State, Nigeria. His mother Bose Ogulu worked as a language translator and his father, Samuel, managed a welding company. His maternal grandfather Benson Idonije once managed Fela Kuti. His mother later became his manager. Ogulu grew up in Southern Nigeria and began making his own beats using FL Studio. He attended Corona Secondary School in Agbara, Ogun State, and relocated to London to further his studies. He studied media technology at the University of Sussex from 2008 to 2009, and also studied media communications and culture at Oxford Brookes University from 2009 to 2010. Burna Boy returned to Port Harcourt and took up a year-long internship at Rhythm 93.7 FM. He launched his music career after returning to Lagos.

2012–2015: L.I.F.E and On a Spaceship 

Burna Boy's debut studio album, L.I.F.E, was released on 12 August 2013, serving as the follow-up to his second mixtape Burn Identity (2011). The album sold 40,000 copies on the first day of its release. Aristokrat Records later sold its marketing rights to Uba Pacific for ₦10 million. The album's release was preceded by five singles: "Like to Party", "Tonight", "Always Love You", "Run My Race", and "Yawa Dey". L.I.F.E was produced entirely by Leriq and features guest appearances from 2face Idibia, M.I Abaga, Timaya, Olamide, Reminisce, and Wizkid, among others. Nigeria Entertainment Today ranked the album 10th on its list of the 12th Best Albums of 2013. The album's music was inspired by Fela Kuti, King Sunny Ade, and Bob Marley. It received generally positive reviews from music critics, who applauded its production. It was nominated for Best Album of the Year at the 2014 Nigeria Entertainment Awards. In August 2013, L.I.F.E peaked at number seven on the Billboard Reggae Albums chart.

In 2014, Burna Boy split from Aristokrat Records. In February 2015, he founded the record label Spaceship Entertainment eight months after leaving Aristocrat Records. Burna Boy's second studio album, titled On a Spaceship, was released on 25 November 2015. His 7-track debut extended play, Redemption, was released in September 2016. Its lead single "Pree Me" debuted on Noisey.

2018: Outside 
On 19 January 2018, Burna Boy was featured on American rock band Fall Out Boy's song "Sunshine Riptide", a track from their seventh studio album Mania. He released his third studio album, Outside, exactly a week later, on 26 January 2018. Described by the singer as a mixtape, Outside consists mostly of afrobeats, dancehall, reggae, and road rap. It features guest appearances from English musicians J Hus, Lily Allen, and Mabel. Outside was supported by six singles: "Rock Your Body", "Streets of Africa", "Koni Baje", "Sekkle Down", "Heaven's Gate" and "Ye". Its production was handled by Leriq, Baba Stiltz, Jae 5, Juls, Chopstix, Steel Banglez, Fred Gibson, Phantom, and FTSE. The album received positive critical acclaim and was ranked by Pulse Nigeria and Nigerian Entertainment Today as the best Nigerian album of 2018. It won Album of the Year at the 2018 Nigeria Entertainment Awards. In February 2018, Outside debuted at number three on the Billboard Reggae Albums chart. A single from the album, "Ye", ended up atop most Nigerian publications year-end list as the biggest song of 2018.

On 7 October 2018, Burna Boy performed before a sold-out crowd at London's O2 Academy Brixton. A day prior to the show, he held a pop-up event at Red by Little Farm and sold limited boxes of his Space Puffs cereal, as well as custom notepads, lighters and graphic tee-shirts. On 9 October 2018, he was announced as one of Spotify's new Afro Hub takeover artists. The announcement coincided with him being named YouTube's Artist on the Rise for three months.

2019: African Giant 
On 3 January 2019, Burna Boy was announced alongside Mr Eazi as one of the artists performing at the 2019 Coachella Valley Music and Arts Festival. He won four awards at the Soundcity MVP Awards Festival, including African Artiste of the Year, Listener's Choice, and Best Male MVP. On 21 March 2019, Burna Boy released the 4-track collaborative EP with Los Angeles-based electronic duo DJDS, titled Steel & Copper. The EP blends Burna Boy's upbeat melodies with DJDS' slinky trap beats. Steel & Copper combines elements of dancehall and reggae music with Afropop and trap.

On 24 June 2019, Burna Boy won Best International Act at the 2019 BET Awards. In July 2019, he was announced as Apple Music Up Next artist. His inclusion into the program was accompanied by a Beats 1 interview with Julie Adenuga and a short documentary. He recorded "Ja Ara E" (Yoruba: "wise up" or "use your head") for Beyoncé's The Lion King: The Gift and was the only guest artist with their own track on the soundtrack album.

Burna Boy's fourth studio album, African Giant, was released on 26 July 2019. It was supported by six singles: "Gbona", "On the Low", Killin Dem", "Dangote", "Anybody" and "Pull Up". He began recording the album in 2018 and told Billboard that it is his most personal project yet. He first revealed plans to release it in April 2019 and held a private listening session in Los Angeles. Photos and videos from the listening session were shared on social media. African Giant was initially announced as a 16-track album. To promote the album, Burna Boy headlined the African Giant Returns tour, the second leg of his African Giant tour. Burna Boy recorded "My Money, My Baby", a track that appeared on Queen & Slims soundtrack album. Described as an "Afrobeat-tinged track", "My Money, My Baby" contains a sample of Fela Kuti's 1972 song "Shakara". On 22 November 2019, Burna Boy was featured alongside English singer-songwriter Ed Sheeran on British rapper Stormzy's single, "Own It", the fourth single from his second studio album, Heavy Is the Head. In November 2019, he became the first Afrobeats artist to sell out the SSE Arena and was given a special plaque to mark his achievement.

2020–2021: Twice as Tall 
In April 2020, Burna Boy performed in the One World: Together at Home special. On 19 June 2020, he was featured on the remix of South African producer Master KG's viral song "Jerusalema". Burna Boy used his signature afrobeats style on the song and also partly sings in the isiZulu language. On 30 July 2020, Burna Boy was featured on British singer Sam Smith's single, "My Oasis", the lead single from their third studio album, Love Goes. His fifth studio album, Twice as Tall, was released on 14 August 2020. It was executive produced by Diddy and his mother, Bose Ogulu. The album became his highest-charting project, debuting at number one on the Billboard World Albums Chart. On 24 November 2020, Twice as Tall was nominated for Best Global Album at the 63rd Annual Grammy Awards. It was the second consecutive year that Burna Boy received a nomination in the category. He won an Edison Award in the World Album category for African Giant, and won Best International Act at the MOBO Awards on 9 December, shaking off competition from Drake, Megan Thee Stallion, Lil Baby and Roddy Ricch. At the 63rd Annual Grammy Awards held on 15 March 2021, he won the Grammy award for Best Global Music album. Burna Boy's song "Destiny" was included in the playlist at the inauguration of Joe Biden. He won Best International Act at the 2021 BET Awards, becoming the first African artist to win the award three consecutive times.

On 19 March 2021, Burna Boy was featured on Canadian singer Justin Bieber's song "Loved by You", a track from his sixth studio album, Justice. On 17 September 2021, he was featured on American singer-songwriter Jon Bellion's single "I Feel It", which marks the first musical collaboration between the two, but the latter co-wrote "Loved by You" with Justin Bieber. On 4 June 2022, Burna Boy performed at the Belgravia Sports Stadium in Harare, Zimbabwe, where he allegedly refused money to wear a ZANU-PF scarf as an endorsement of the Mnangagwa administration.

2022: Love, Damini and club shooting
Burna Boy released his sixth studio album, Love, Damini, on 8 July 2022.  Its release was preceded by the singles "Kilometre" and "Last Last". 

On 8 June 2022, Burna Boy's armed security escorts allegedly shot and wounded two people at a nightclub in Lagos. According to the wife of one of the victims, the incident began after she declined Burna Boy's invitation to join him in the VIP section. Five security guards affiliated with Burna Boy were arrested and charged with attempted murder. The woman later accused the singer and his family of trying to silence her family with hush money. As of 20 June 2022, CCTV footage of the shooting had not been released by the club. On 1 January 2023, during the Lagos leg of his Love, Damini tour, a visibly upset Burna Boy denied the nightclub shooting rumor and rumors about his mother  being a former backup dancer for Afrobeat pioneer Fela Kuti.

Burna Boy held his first concert in Jamaica on December 18, 2022, at the Jamaica National Stadium.

Personal life 
Burna Boy began dating British rapper Stefflon Don in 2018. They broke up in 2022.

Artistry 
Burna Boy's music is mainly pop and afrobeats. He describes his music as Afro-fusion, which blends the genres R&B, hip hop, dancehall, and reggae. August Brown of the Los Angeles Times said Burna Boy's sound is "savvy and modern but undistracted by obvious crossover moves".

Discography 

 L.I.F.E (2013)
 On a Spaceship (2015)
 Outside (2018)
 African Giant (2019)
 Twice as Tall (2020)
 Love, Damini (2022)

See also 

List of awards and nominations received by Burna Boy
List of Nigerian musicians
List of people from Port Harcourt

References

External links 

Living people
1991 births
Alumni of Oxford Brookes University
Alumni of the University of Sussex
Atlantic Records artists
English-language singers from Nigeria
Grammy Award winners
MTV Europe Music Award winners
Musicians from Rivers State
21st-century Nigerian male singers
Nigerian reggae musicians
Nigerian singer-songwriters
People from Port Harcourt
Yoruba-language singers